Jincheon County (Jincheon-gun) is a county in Chungcheongbuk-do (North Chungcheong) Province, South Korea.

Location
Jincheon belongs to the middle of Chungcheongbuk-do. It borders several cities of its province but also meets Gyeonggi-do. The southwestern part of this area is mountainous.

Industry
Farming has moved from the second most successful industry to the major contribution of this region. Hyundai Autonet moved its former factories into Jincheon and got to operate from February 2008.

CJ also revealed its plan to construct a processing complex.

In a Korean village, A Squid Game doll also had been spotted.

Festival
Jincheon holds a World Taekwondo Hwarang festival every year. The festival is an opportunity for all enthusiasts of Taekwondo to come together.

The festival has more meaning as experience, since it not only provides a splendid tour opportunity in Korea, but participants also experience the spirit of Korean martial arts.

Tourist attractions
Jincheon Bell Museum
The Jincheon Bell Museum was opened in September 2005 to inform people of the Korean bells and their artistic value that received recognition from the world through various activities including planning exhibitions and education as well as studying, collecting, exhibiting, and preserving them.

Nonggyo Bridge in Jincheon
This stone bridge called 'Nonggyo Bridge' as the bridge on Saegeumcheon in front of Gulti Village, Gugok-ri, Munbaek-myeon. According to the record of 『Sangsanji()』(1932), General Lim built it in the early Goryeo Dynasty.

Twin towns – sister cities
Jincheon is twinned with:
 Seongdong-gu, Seoul
 Gangdong-gu, Seoul
 Vallejo, California, United States

Climate
Jincheon has a humid continental climate (Köppen: Dwa), but can be considered a borderline humid subtropical climate (Köppen: Cwa) using the  isotherm.

See also
Jincheon National Training Center

References

External links
Jincheon County government English-language home page

 
Counties of North Chungcheong Province